From Hand to Art (Chinese: 一手造成) is a Hong Kong lifestyle television program produced by Television Broadcasts Limited (TVB). It was created by TVB programme producer Liang Jian Heng 梁儉恆) and Zhang Ying Shan (張穎珊). The programme was first showed on 30 September 2012, and ended on 17 February 2013, on TVB Jade. It was broadcast on every Sunday at 7 pm, 30 minutes each. A total of 18 episodes were aired.

From Hand to Art was themed on traditional handicrafts in Hong Kong. It was hosted by TVB artists Sarah Song, Amigo Choi and Leung Ka Ki. In each episode, two hosts visited and interviewed experts of traditional handicrafts such as Shanghai barber Tao and Gao, wooden puppet master Choi, and Qipao tailor Liu. While listening to the stories of old Hong Kong, the hosts learnt how to make the handicrafts.

Episode guide

Critics 
From Hand to Art received support from audiences and positive reviews in online forums. Online commenters praised the programme as being "meaningful" and they did learn more about local handicrafts. Some said the programme successfully aroused arouse public's interest in traditional handicrafts such as paper crafts, carvings, shadow plays and cheongsam (qipao), while others felt sorry for the sunset of these beautiful arts due to scarce successors. Moreover, audiences admired the lifelong devotion of the art masters to their works. One forum user even asked for the address and contact number of Master Wong, a sewing master featured in episode 12.

See also 
List of Hong Kong television series

References

External links 
Video.Online.HK

Variety shows